Fayaz Ahmad Jan is an Indian papier-mâché artisan, who was awarded the Padma Shri (2019), the fourth highest civilian award in India for his work in artcraft and papier-mâché. Fayaz has participated in various workshops, held in the United States, Brazil, France, Sweden, Italy, Singapore, Oman, Dubai, Iran and Kyrgyzstan. He hails from Hassanabad of Srinagar district, Kashmir.

See also 

 List of Padma Shri award recipients (2010–2019)

References

Living people
Recipients of the Padma Shri in arts
People from Srinagar district
Year of birth missing (living people)

Indian male artists